James or Jim Kelley may refer to:

People
James Kelley (Pennsylvania state senator) (James Reeves Kelley, born c. 1933), Pennsylvania judge and politician
James R. Kelley (Pennsylvania state representative) (1839–1871), speaker of the Pennsylvania House of Representatives
James T. Kelley (1854–1933), Irish-born American silent film actor
James T. Kelley (architect) (1855–1929), American architect
Jim Kelley (1949–2010), American sports news columnist
Jim Kelley, Canadian presenter, co-host of the reality TV series Junk Brothers

Other uses
James Kelley House (disambiguation), historic sites in the US
Jim Kelley Amplifiers, a guitar amplifier manufacturer

See also
Kelley James (born 1983), American singer-songwriter
James Kelly (disambiguation)